Stéphanie Savoie (born September 11, 1989) is a Canadian baseball catcher from Quebec. She is a member of the Canada women's national baseball team which won a silver medal at the 2015 Pan American Games.

She was named twice best catcher of the Women's World Cup.

Playing career
Savoie has competed at the catcher position in four IBAF Women's World Cups (2008, 2010, 2012, 2014).  At the 2012 IBAF Women's World Cup, she batted .520, while at the 2014 edition, she posted a .450 batting average, complemented by 7 RBI's. Also in 2014, she threw out six attempted base stealers, leading all catchers in the tournament.
Competing with Team Alberta, she helped the squad capture the gold medal at the 2014 Senior Women's Invitational (also known as the Canadian women's baseball championships).

Awards and honours
 2012 IBAF Women's World Cup All-Tournament Team (Catcher)
 2014 IBAF Women's World Cup All-Tournament Team (Catcher)
 Finalist, 2014 Tip O’Neill Award
 2019 inductee, Baseball Québec Hall of Fame (Temple de la renommée du baseball québécois RDS)

Personal
Savoie is employed as a physical education teacher. Her favorite baseball player is catcher Russell Martin.

References

External links 
 Stéphanie Savoie on Team Canada

People from Bas-Saint-Laurent
Canadian female baseball players
Baseball people from Quebec
Baseball catchers
1989 births
Living people
Baseball players at the 2015 Pan American Games
Pan American Games silver medalists for Canada
Pan American Games medalists in baseball
Medalists at the 2015 Pan American Games